Erynnis lucilius, the columbine duskywing, is a species of butterfly in the family Hesperiidae. It is found in North America from southern Quebec to Manitoba and south to the north-eastern United States.

The wingspan is 21–29 mm. There are two generations in the east from early May to mid-June.

Nutrition 
The larvae and mature caterpillars feed on leaves while adult butterflies consume flower nectar.

Lifecycle 
Larva eggs are attached on the underside of plant leaves. Once hatched, the larva consume the surrounding plant leaves and rest from time to time in the shade of plants. Larva continue to eat until they fully mature as caterpillars. At full maturity, caterpillars begin their hibernation to being their transformation into adult butterflies. Adult Duskywings pollinate plants as they consume nectar and seek out another butterfly to mate with. After mating, female Duskywings lay their newly born eggs on the underside of a plant leaf ready to hatch.

Appearance 
The Duskywing will appear in shades of brown. The underside of the hindwing has marginal spots. Males of the species have a costal fold containing yellow-colored "scent scales" to provide a sense of smell. Females of the species have their "scent scales" on the 7th abdominal segment.

Habitat 
Duskywings can be found in ecosystems containing ravines and gullies. Mostly living in rocky and deciduous woodland forests, the Duskywing will prefer natural shady areas to rest with plenty of leafy plants for consumption.

References

External links
Columbine Duskywing, Nearctica
Columbine Duskywing, BugGuide

Erynnis
Butterflies described in 1870
Butterflies of North America
Taxa named by Samuel Hubbard Scudder